Ismail Marzuki Park, (Indonesian: Taman Ismail Marzuki, TIM), is an arts, cultural, and science center located at Cikini in Jakarta, Indonesia. Taman Ismail Marzuki complex comprises a number of facilities including six performing arts theaters, cinemas, exhibition hall, gallery, libraries and an archive building. The complex is built on an 9 hectares land area, which was previously a zoo. TIM is named after Ismail Marzuki, one of Indonesia's most influential composers.

The goal to build the complex was to use it as a hub for fine and performing arts, a window into the Indonesia's diverse and rich culture. The complex was previously known as Jakarta Arts Center. Management of TIM was handed to the Jakarta Arts Council, while operations are funded by rental fees for the facilities and subsidies from the Jakarta city administration.

History 

Inaugurated by Jakarta Governor Ali Sadikin, on 10 November 1968, the 90 meter square cultural center was built on the former Taman Raden Saleh, a public park established and owned by Raden Saleh, who was a famous Indonesian painter during the colonial era. Taman Raden Saleh was previously Jakarta's zoo and a public park, before the being moved to Ragunan Zoo. Taman Raden Saleh previously hosted a Greyhound racing arena, a cinema, a Garden Hall and a podium.

The Jakarta administration has undertaken revitalization project which would be conducted in stages for TIM with an estimated cost of US$125 million, and expected to be completed by 2021. The revitalization includes improving the interiors and other facilities of TIM, including the planetarium, as well as construct a library and a mosque to replace the existing ones. A new movie theater is to be built to replace the Cinema XXI movie theater that shut down.

Jakarta Arts Council
Jakarta Arts Council (Indonesian:Dewan Kesenian Jakarta -DKJ) was founded by Indonesian artists and had been officially stated by The Governor of Jakarta, Ali Sadikin, on June 17, 1969. The responsibility and the functions of the Jakarta Arts Council are to build partnership with the Governor of Jakarta, formulating policies for supporting the activities and development of the arts in the capital region.

During the early stages, the members of Jakarta Arts Council had been appointed by the Academy of Jakarta, consisting of intellectuals and people of the cultural and arts of Indonesia. As time progresses the selection process is conducted transparently through a team of art scholars and experts, both from within and outside the Academy of Jakarta. They receive the candidates from the public and respected arts groups for 3 years period term. The arts development is carried out through annual programs from each committee. DKJ consists of 25 members and divided into 6 committees: Film, Music, Literature, Fine Arts, Dance and Drama.

Infrastructure and facilities in the complex 

Within the complex there are also educational institutions such as the Jakarta Arts Institute (IKJ), the HB Jassin Literary Documentation Center and Jakarta Planetarium. There is also a large food-court within the complex. Cultural performances often take place in this cultural center, including dance, drama and music performances, poetry reading, sculpture, painting and art exhibitions, and film festival screenings. 
 Graha Bhakti Budaya, a performing art hall with an 800-seat capacity, 600 on the ground floor and 200 on the balcony. The stage measures 15m x 10m x 6m. This air conditioned hall is equipped with lighting, acoustic technology and sound systems; and  stages musical concerts,  performing arts such as drama, traditional or contemporary dances, and also film screenings.
 Galeri Cipta I, II and III, are galleries housing fine arts, paintings and sculpture exhibitions, art discussions, seminars, and short film screenings. These galleries can contain 80 paintings and 20 sculptures.
 Teater Jakarta is a performing art studio which has two theater, the larger one with a capacity of 1200 and the smaller one with capacity of 300 spectators. Theater, music, poetry and seminars are staged here. The stage measures 10m x 5m x 6m. The building equipped with acoustic and lighting systems and is air conditioned.
 Kineforum, a 45-person capacity theater run by the Jakarta Arts Council.
 Teater Halaman or Studio Pertunjukan Seni is an open-air auditorium for experimental art for young artist's theater and for poetry performances.
 Plaza: the courtyard of TIM is sometimes used as additional space to stage outdoor performing that can accommodate 2,500 spectators.
Jakarta Arts Institute (IKJ), HB Jassin Literary Documentation Center and Jakarta Planetarium also located within the complex.
Jakarta Public Library (Perpustakaan Jakarta), located at the 4th, 5th, and 6th floor of the Ali Sadikin Building as the new facility of TIM. This library is in the same location as the HB Jassin Center for Literary Documents (Pusat Dokmen Sastra or PDS). Apart from being a library, there are additional facilities such as indoor and outdoor play rooms. Indoor playroom is provided for children. Other facilities of this library are stair shelves for reading, in addition to bookshelves. The manager also provides booths for visitors who need privacy to read or work. The booths can be filled by two people.

Cited works

References

Cultural centers in Indonesia
Buildings and structures in Jakarta
Tourist attractions in Jakarta
Cultural Properties of Indonesia in Jakarta
Event venues established in 1968
1968 establishments in Indonesia
Central Jakarta